Abramovite is a very rare mineral from the sulfides and sulfosalt categories. It has the chemical formula Pb2SnInBiS7. It occurs as tiny elongated lamellar-shaped crystals, up 1 mm × 0.2 mm in size, and is characterized by its non-commensurate structure.

Etymology and history
Abramovite is named after the mineralogist Dmitry Vadimovich Abramov (born 1963) of the A.E. Fersman Museum, Russia.

It was discovered as fumarole crust on the Kudriavy (Kudryavyi) volcano, Iturup Island, Kuril Islands, Sakhalin Oblast, Far East Region, Russia.

Formation
Abramovite is a product of precipitation from fumarolic gases in an active stratovolcano.

See also
 List of minerals

References

Sulfosalt minerals
Triclinic minerals
Minerals in space group 2